Morenocetus is an extinct genus of primitive balaenid from the Early Miocene (Burdigalian and Colhuehuapian in the SALMA classification) Gaiman Formation of Patagonia, Argentina.

Description 
Morenocetus is distinguished from more derived balaenids in the narrow exposure of the squamosal lateral to the exoccipital, a short supraorbital process of the frontal, straight lateral edges of the supraoccipital, and a postorbital process of the frontal oriented posteriorly. It can be distinguished from the only other Miocene balaenid, Peripolocetus in having a dorsoventrally expanded zygomatic process of the squamosal.

Classification 
Morenocetus is the oldest named extinct balaenid so far, although a chaeomysticete specimen from late Oligocene marine deposits in New Zealand was reported as a stem-balaenid in an SVP 2002 abstract by Ewan Fordyce.

References

Further reading 
 A. Cabrera. 1926. Cetaceos fósiles del Museo de La Plata. Revista del Museo de La Plata 29:363-411

Balaenidae
Prehistoric cetacean genera
Miocene cetaceans
Miocene mammals of South America
Colhuehuapian
Neogene Argentina
Fossils of Argentina
Gaiman Formation
Fossil taxa described in 1926